William, Will, or Bill Wright may refer to:

William

Arts & Entertainment
William Aldis Wright (1831–1914), English editor, literary executor of Edward FitzGerald
William Garrett Wright (born 1979), American poet and editor
William Wright (poet) (1782–?), Scottish poet
William Lord Wright (1879–1947), American screenwriter and film producer
William Wright (actor) (1911–1949), American film actor in the 1940s
William Wright (author) (1930–2016), American non-fiction writer

Military
William Wierman Wright (1824–1882), American civil engineer and Civil War officer for U.S. Military Railroads
William P. Wright (1846–1933), American Civil War officer
Sir William Purvis Wright (1846–1910), Royal Marines officer
William M. Wright (1863–1943), lieutenant general in the United States Army
William Wright (Indian civil servant) (1895–1990), British World War I flying ace
William Wright (Medal of Honor) (1835–?), Medal of Honor recipient

Politics

U.S. politics
William Wright (New Jersey politician) (1794–1866), mayor of Newark, New Jersey and U.S. Senator
William W. Wright (1813–1889), New York politician and Erie Canal Commissioner
William Bacon Wright (1830–1895), Confederate politician
William Ambrose Wright (1844–1929), Georgia state comptroller
William C. Wright (1866–1933), U.S. Representative from Georgia

Other politics
William Wright (16th century MP), MP for the City of York (1515) and lord mayor of York (1518–1519)
William Wright (Australian politician) (1816–1877), British Army officer and politician in colonial Victoria
William McKay Wright (1840–1882), Canadian Member of Parliament, Pontiac
William Wright (Canadian politician) (1853–1926), Canadian Member of Parliament, Muskoka
William Wright (Scottish politician) (1862–1931), Member of Parliament for Rutherglen, 1922–1931
Sir William Wright (businessman) (1925–2022), Northern Irish business owner and Unionist politician

Religion
William Wright (English priest) (1563–1639), English Catholic missionary priest
William Burnet Wright (1836–1924), Congregational clergyman from Ohio
William Wright (missionary) (1837–1899), Irish missionary in Damascus 
William Wright (Canadian bishop) (1904–1990), Canadian Anglican bishop 
William Godsell Wright (1904–1973), Episcopal prelate who served as Bishop of Nevada
William Wright (Australian bishop) (1952–2021), bishop of Maitland-Newcastle

Science
William Wright (botanist) (1735–1819), Scottish physician and botanist
William Wright (surgeon) (1773–1860), English aural surgeon
William Barton Wright (1828–1915), British railway engineer
William Hammond Wright (1871–1959), American astronomer
William Wright (engineer) (c. 1880), American railway engineer

Sports
William Wright (cricketer, born 1841) (1841–1916), English cricketer
William Wright (cricketer, born 1909) (1909–1988), English cricketer
William Wright (footballer) (1893–1945), English footballer for Exeter City and Huddersfield Town
Will Wright (footballer) (born 1997), English footballer for Gillingham

Other
William Wright (privateer), English privateer and buccaneer
William B. Wright (1806–1868), justice of the New York Supreme Court 
William Wright (orientalist) (1830–1889), professor of Arabic at the University of Cambridge
William Henry Wright (1876–1951), Canadian prospector, founder of The Globe and Mail
William Wright (master), English academic
William Wright (journalist), founder of the London-based think tank New Financial
William James Wright (1903–1994), Scottish farmer and agriculturalist

Will
Will Wright (actor) (1894–1962), American character actor in film and TV
Will Wright (game designer) (born 1960), co-founder of Maxis, designer of SimCity
Will Wright (cyclist) (born 1973), Welsh cyclist

Bill
Bill Wright (catcher) (1864–1940), American professional baseball catcher
Bill Wright (footballer, born 1914) (1914–?), English footballer
Bill Wright (outfielder) (1914–1996), American baseball outfielder in the Negro leagues
Bill Wright (rugby union) (1905–1971), New Zealand rugby player
Bill Wright (golfer) (1936–2021), American golfer

See also
Billy Wright (disambiguation)
Willie Wright (disambiguation)
Dan DeQuille (1829–1898), pseudonym for William Wright, American journalist
Rasty Wright (outfielder) (1863–1922), born William Wright, American baseball player